Sudhira Das (8 March 1932 – 30 October 2015) was an Indian engineer. She was the first female engineer from the state of Odisha. She became an engineer at a time when education was a taboo for women in India.

Early life 
She was born in an aristocratic family in Cuttack, Odisha on 8 March 1932. She had a passion for Mathematics from her childhood.

Education 
She graduated with Bachelor of Science from the Ravenshaw College in 1951, after which she joined University of Science and Technology, Calcutta in 1956 for her masters in Radio Physics and Electronics.

Work 
After graduating with her MSc. (Tech), Das started teaching at the Berhampur Engineering School (currently Uma Charan Pattnaik Engineering School) as a lecturer in the department of Mathematics in 1957. Later she became the principal of Women's Polytechnic, Rourkela. During 1957–1990, she served the Government of Odisha in various different capacities. During that period she founded Women's Polytechnic, Bhubaneswar, an institutions providing diploma programs to female students which has been one of her major contributions.

Death 
She died on 30 October 2015 at the age of 83.

References

External links

Indian women engineers
1932 births
2015 deaths
People from Cuttack
Ravenshaw University alumni
University of Calcutta alumni
20th-century Indian engineers
20th-century Indian women scientists
Women scientists from Odisha
Engineers from Odisha
21st-century Indian women scientists
21st-century Indian engineers
20th-century women engineers
21st-century women engineers